The Worshipful Company of Educators is the 109th livery company of the City of London, having been granted livery status on 10 September 2013 by the Court of Aldermen.
The Company was founded on 24 May 2001 as a Guild to represent the education and training profession and for charitable purposes. On 15 September 2009 the City's Court of Aldermen granted the petition of the Guild of Educators and agreed that the Guild be constituted one of the Companies of the City, without a grant of livery, with the title of The Company of Educators and that its Ordinances be approved and duly enrolled amongst the records of the City. Upon being advanced to the status of City livery company in 2013, the Company was accorded the official title of Worshipful Company of Educators, although less formally it can continue to be known as the Educators' Company.

On 11 October 2017, the Worshipful Company of Educators was granted a Royal Charter by the Queen. The Company provides a forum through meetings and social occasions to bring together members from all parts of the education world to discuss and exchange views on matters of topical interest.  The Educators’ Trust provides Awards and Bursaries for outstanding, innovative and inspirational practice in a wide range of educational subjects, levels and settings.

Masters

The Educators' Trust
In accordance with the philanthropic tradition of the City of London Livery Companies, the Worshipful Company of Educators operates a separate charitable fund (Charity Reg. No. 110435). It does so to support the development of those who are engaged in the profession of education, development and training.

The objects of the charitable Trust are:

 To reward excellence and innovation in their achievement and training in order to encourage both students and their mentors to undertake, and the public to appreciate, the work of educators
 To promote, by the award of bursaries and grants and other appropriate means, the development of educators through research and study that is appropriate to the profession of educator and that increases understanding of relevant opportunities and needs
 To advance education and its delivery through promotion of public presentations and discussion if relevant developments, and the generation of reports to policy-making bodies and the general public.

Special Interest Groups
The Company currently has ten special interest groups:
Higher Education (SIGHE), 
Special Education Needs & Disability (SIGSEND),
Careers Information and Guidance (SIGCIG),
Education in the Justice System (SIGECJS), 
Further Education, Skills & Lifelong Learning (SIGFESL), 
Environmental and  Outdoor Education (SIGEOE),  
School Improvement and Leadership (SIGSIL), 
Multi Academy Trusts (SIGMAT),
Military Education (SIGME) and
Arts and Cultural Education (SIGARTS)

Company Church
 St James Garlickhythe

References

External links
 The Company of Educators
 City of London Corporation: City livery companies

Educators
Educational organisations based in England
Organisations based in the City of London
2013 establishments in England